The 2013 World Solar Challenge was one of a biennial series of solar-powered car races, covering  through the Australian Outback, from Darwin, Northern Territory to Adelaide, South Australia.

In all, 37 teams competed of which 16 completed the course. There were three classes: Cruiser, Challenge and Adventure. The Cruiser class was won by Eindhoven University of Technology of the Netherlands; the Challenge class by Nuon Solar Team of the Netherlands; and the Adventure class by the Australian Aurora team.

Results tables

Cruiser class

Challenger class

Adventure class

References

 WSC 2013 Cruiser class results
 WSC 2013 Challenger class results
 WSC 2013 Adventure class results

Solar car races
Scientific organisations based in Australia
Science competitions
Photovoltaics
Recurring sporting events established in 1987